Invisible disabilities, also known as hidden disabilities or non-visible disabilities (NVD), are disabilities that are not immediately apparent, are typically chronic illnesses and conditions that significantly impair normal activities of daily living.

For instance, some people with visual or auditory disabilities who do not wear glasses or hearing aids, or who use discreet hearing aids, may not be obviously disabled. Some people who have vision loss may wear contact lenses. A sitting disability is another category of invisible impairments; sitting problems are usually caused by chronic back pain. Those with joint problems or chronic pain may not use mobility aids on some days, or at all. Most people with RSI move in a typical and inconspicuous way, and are even encouraged by the medical community to be as active as possible, including playing sports; yet those people can have dramatic limitations in how much they can type, write or how long they can hold a phone or other objects in their hands.

It is estimated that 1 in 10 people live with an invisible disability.

Impact
Invisible disabilities, also known as Hidden Disabilities or Non-visible Disabilities (NVD), can hinder a person's efforts to go to school, work, socialize, and more. Although the disability creates a challenge for the person who has it, the reality of the disability can be difficult for others to recognize or acknowledge. Others may not understand the cause of the problem, if they cannot see evidence of it in a visible way. Students with cognitive impairments find it difficult to organize and complete school work, but teachers who are unaware of the reason for a student's difficulties, can become impatient. A columnist for Psychology Today wrote:

This lack of understanding can be detrimental to a person's social capital. People may see someone with an invisible disability as lazy, weak, or antisocial. A disability may cause someone to lose connections with friends or family due to this lack of understanding, potentially leading to a lower self-esteem.

A disability that may be visible in some situations may not be obvious in others, which can result in a serious problem. For example, a plane passenger who is deaf may be unable to hear verbal instructions given by a flight attendant. It is for this reason that travellers with a hidden disability are advised to inform the airline of their need for accommodations before their flight. One such passenger wrote in The Globe and Mail that:

Some employees with an invisible disability choose not to disclose their diagnosis with their employer, due to social stigma directed at people with disabilities, either in the workplace or in society in general. This may occur when a psychiatric disability is involved, or a number of other medical conditions that are invisible. Researchers in the human resources field may need to take this non-disclosure into account when carrying out studies. Many people who think of those with a disability generally consider them lower to middle class due to their medical costs, and also because many people with disabilities often lack reliable, full-time employment. According to one US survey, 74% of individuals with a disability do not use a wheelchair or other aids that may visually portray their disability. A 2011 survey found that 88% of people with an invisible disability had negative views of disclosing their disability to employers. Data from the Bureau of Labor Statistics in 2017 states that the unemployment rate for individuals with an invisible disability is higher than those without one. The unemployment rate for people with a disability was 9.2%, while the rate of those without was less than half of this at only 4.2%. BBC states that people with HIV specifically have an unemployment rate three times higher than those without HIV. Beyond the work force, Bureau of Labor Statistics data also showed that individuals with an invisible disability are also less likely to receive a bachelor's degree or higher education.

Prevalence

United States
In the United States, 96% of people with chronic medical conditions show no outward signs of their illness, and 10% experience symptoms that are considered disabling.

Nearly one in two Americans (165 million) has a chronic medical condition of one kind or another. However, most of these people are not actually disabled, as their medical conditions do not impair normal activities.

Ninety-six percent of people with chronic medical conditions live with a condition that is invisible. These people do not use a cane or any assistive device and act as if they did not have a medical condition. About a quarter of them have some type of activity limitation, ranging from mild to severe; the remaining 75% are not disabled by their chronic conditions.

Legal protection

Those with invisible disabilities are protected by national and local disability laws, such as the Americans with Disabilities Act in the US. The Rehabilitation Act of 1973 has been amended several times such that the definition of "handicapped" includes the statement, "any person who... (C) is regarded as having such an impairment".

This particular defining point of "handicapped" puts the assessment of impairment in the hands of observers who may or may not regard others as having an impairment. For people with disabilities, invisible or not, this creates a space for discriminatory practices which stem from the observer's perception of who is disabled and who is not.

In the United Kingdom, the Equality Act 2010 (and the Disability Discrimination Act 1995 before it) require employers to make reasonable adjustments for employees with disabilities, both visible and invisible.

Responses

A growing number of organizations, governments, and institutions are implementing policies and regulations to accommodate persons with invisible disabilities. Governments and school boards have implemented screening tests to identify students with learning disabilities, as well as other invisible disabilities, such as vision or hearing difficulties, or problems in cognitive ability, motor skills, or social or emotional development. If a hidden disability is identified, resources can be used to place a child in a special education program that will help them progress in school.

One mitigation is to provide an easy way for people to self-designate as having an invisible disability, and for organisations to have processes in place to assist those so self-designating.  An example of this is the Hidden Disabilities Sunflower, initially launched in the UK in 2016 but now gaining some international recognition as well.

Campaigns 
In the UK activist Athaly Altay began the End Fake Claiming Campaign in 2021, to raise awareness of the widespread harassment faced by people with Invisible Disabilities. The campaign calls on the UK government to update Hate Crime laws to make fake claiming a specific hate crime.

See also
Disability etiquette
Equal Employment Opportunity Commission
Social model of disability
Mental disorder

References

Further reading
 Sveilich, C. (2004). Just Fine: Unmasking Concealed Chronic Illness and Pain. Avid Reader Press. .

External links
Invisible Disabilities Association nonprofit organization based in Parker, Colorado
ButYouDontLookSick.com website, blog, message board and chatroom
 

Disability by type